Rikke Iversen (born 18 May 1993) is a Danish handball player for Odense Håndbold and the Danish national team. She has previously played in Nykøbing Falster Håndboldklub.

She is the sister of Sarah Iversen who plays in Herning-Ikast Håndbold.

She represented Denmark at the 2020 European Women's Handball Championship and at the 2021 World Women's Handball Championship in Spain.

References

External links

1993 births
Living people
Danish female handball players
People from Guldborgsund Municipality
Handball players at the 2010 Summer Youth Olympics
Youth Olympic gold medalists for Denmark
Sportspeople from Region Zealand